VIVO Cannabis Inc (formerly ABcann Global) is a Canadian licensed cannabis producer, headquartered in Napanee, Ontario. The company trades on the Toronto Stock Exchange as VIVO.

History 
VIVO received two of the first 15 licences by Health Canada in 2014. It became a publicly traded company in April 2017 on the TSX Venture Exchange. In August 2017, the company received a $15 million investment by Cannabis Wheaton to fund the second production facility at its 65-acre property in Napanee. Effective January 24, 2020, the company's stocks were moved from the TSX Venture Exchange to the Toronto Stock Exchange.

Operations 
The company has three cannabis brands: Beacon Medical, Fireside and Lumina. The products are grown using seeds from the Netherlands, and a computerized process where each plant is controlled and monitored. The company has a comprehensive research partnership with the University of Guelph to enhance cannabis production and uses.

In February 2018, VIVO acquired Harvest Medicine Inc, a medical cannabis clinic with 9,700 patients. In August 2018, they acquired Canna Farms, a licensed producer located in Hope, British Columbia.

VIVO works with the Ontario Cannabis Store and the Alberta Gaming, Liquor, and Cannabis Commission as a supplier of recreational marijuana to Ontario and Alberta. Canna Farms, a VIVO subsidiary, is a supplier of recreational marijuana to British Columbia through the B.C. Liquor Distribution Branch.

References

External links
VIVO Cannabis Website

Cannabis cultivation
Canadian companies established in 2017
Companies listed on the Toronto Stock Exchange
Companies formerly listed on the TSX Venture Exchange
Cannabis in Ontario
Agriculture companies established in 2017
2017 establishments in Ontario